Louisiana Territory is a 1953 American historical drama film directed by Harry W. Smith (who also photographed the film), from an original screenplay by Jerome Brondfield. It opens with the circumstances of the sale of the Louisiana Territory by Napoleon's government and the roles of Robert Livingston and Charles Maurice de Talleyrand-Périgord. However, most of the film deals with the spirit of Livingston visiting major cities of the territory decades later in 1953.

Produced by RKO-Pathé, it was distributed by its sister company, RKO Radio Pictures, who premiered the film in New Orleans on October 14, 1953, with a national release two days later, on October 16. The film stars Val Winter as Livingston and Leo Zinser as Talleyrand. It also stars Julian Miester and Phyliss Massicot.

References

External links

RKO Pictures films
American historical drama films
1953 films
1953 drama films
American 3D films
1953 3D films
1950s historical drama films
1950s English-language films
1950s American films
English-language drama films